Ihosy is a district in south-eastern Madagascar. It is a part of Ihorombe Region and borders the districts of Ikalamavony in north, Ambalavao in northeast, Ivohibe in east, Iakora in southeast, Betroka in south, Benenitra in southwest, Sakaraha and Ankazoabo Sud in west and Beroraha in the South West.

Communes
The district is further divided into 20 communes:

 Ambatolahy
 Ambia
 Analaliry
 Analavoka
 Andiolava
 Andohan'ilakaka
 Ankily
 Antsoha
 Ihosy
 Ilakaka
 Irina
 Mahasoa
 Menamaty Iloto
 Ranohira
 Sahambano
 Sakalalina
 Satrokala
 Soamatasy
 Tolohomiady
 Zazafotsy

References

Districts of Ihorombe